Wroldsen is a Norwegian surname. Notable people with the surname include:

 Erik Wroldsen (born 1973), Norwegian heavy metal drummer
 Ernst Wroldsen (born 1944), Norwegian politician
 Ina Wroldsen (born 1984), Norwegian composer and singer

Surnames of Norwegian origin